This is a list of the squads picked for the 2019 Cricket World Cup. All 10 teams were required to submit a 15-member squad by 23 April, with changes to the squad allowed to be made up to 22 May. New Zealand were the first team to name their squad, naming their team on 3 April 2019. The West Indies were the last team to name their squad, announcing their team on 24 April 2019, one day after the initial deadline set by the International Cricket Council (ICC).

Two cricketers, New Zealand's Tom Blundell and Bangladesh's Abu Jayed, had not played in a One Day International (ODI) prior to being named in their team's squad. On 13 May 2019, Jayed made his ODI debut for Bangladesh, against the West Indies, in the fifth match of the tri-series in Ireland. Three captains, England's Eoin Morgan, the West Indies' Jason Holder and Bangladesh's Mashrafe Mortaza, had led their respective teams in the previous tournament.

Key

Afghanistan
Afghanistan announced their 15-man squad on 22 April. Following Afghanistan's second match, Mohammad Shahzad was ruled out of the tournament due to injury. He was replaced by Ikram Alikhil. On 27 June 2019, Aftab Alam was ruled out of the tournament due to "exceptional circumstances" and was replaced by Sayed Shirzad.

Coach:  Phil Simmons

Australia
Australia announced their 15-man squad on 15 April. Jhye Richardson was originally included in the squad but on 8 May 2019, he was ruled out of the tournament with a dislocated shoulder and replaced by Kane Richardson. Cricket Australia named Mitchell Marsh as cover for Marcus Stoinis, ahead of Australia's match against Pakistan on 12 June 2019. Stoinis was ruled out of the fixture due to an injury, with Cricket Australia waiting to see if he's ruled out of the rest of the tournament. Ahead of Australia's final group-stage match, Shaun Marsh was ruled out of the rest of the tournament with a fractured forearm. Peter Handscomb was named as his replacement. Usman Khawaja picked up a hamstring injury during Australia's final group-stage match, ruling him out of the rest of the tournament. Matthew Wade was named as cover for him.

Coach:  
Justin Langer

Bangladesh
Bangladesh announced their 15-man squad on 16 April.

Coach:  Steve Rhodes

England
England announced their 15-man squad on 17 April. It originally included Alex Hales, though he was later withdrawn following a ban for recreational drug use. England announced their final squad on 21 May, with Jofra Archer, Liam Dawson and James Vince replacing David Willey, Joe Denly and Alex Hales.

Coach:  Trevor Bayliss

India
India announced their 15-man squad on 15 April. They have also named Ambati Rayudu, Rishabh Pant, Axar Patel, Navdeep Saini and Ishant Sharma as stand-by players for the team, who can be drafted in the event of injuries to any player. Rishabh Pant was called up to India's squad as cover for Shikhar Dhawan, after Dhawan suffered a hairline fracture on his left thumb during India's game against Australia. On 19 June 2019, the Board of Control for Cricket in India (BCCI) confirmed that Dhawan had been ruled out for the rest of the tournament, with Pant confirmed as his replacement. Vijay Shankar was ruled out of India's final two round-robin matches due to an injury, with Mayank Agarwal named as his replacement.

Coach:  Ravi Shastri

New Zealand
New Zealand announced their 15-man squad on 3 April 2019.

Coach:  Gary Stead

Pakistan
Pakistan announced their initial World Cup squad on 18 April. They announced their final squad on 20 May, with Junaid Khan, Faheem Ashraf and Abid Ali replaced by Wahab Riaz, Mohammad Amir and Asif Ali.

Coach:  Mickey Arthur

South Africa
South Africa announced their World Cup squad on 18 April. Anrich Nortje was originally included in the squad but on 7 May 2019, he was ruled out of the tournament with a hand injury and replaced by Chris Morris. Dale Steyn was ruled out of the tournament due to an ongoing shoulder injury, and was replaced by Beuran Hendricks.

Coach:  Ottis Gibson

Sri Lanka
Sri Lanka announced their World Cup squad on 18 April. Nuwan Pradeep was ruled out of Sri Lanka's last two matches of the tournament, after contracting chickenpox. He was replaced by Kasun Rajitha.

Coach:  Chandika Hathurusingha

West Indies
West Indies announced their World Cup squad on 24 April. On 19 May 2019, Sunil Ambris, Dwayne Bravo, John Campbell, Jonathan Carter, Roston Chase, Shane Dowrich, Keemo Paul, Khary Pierre, Raymon Reifer and Kieron Pollard were all named as reserve players by Cricket West Indies. On 24 June 2019, Andre Russell was ruled out of the rest of the tournament, due to a knee injury, and was replaced by Sunil Ambris.

Coach:  Floyd Reifer

Statistics

ODI caps

Age

Notes

References

Cricket World Cup squads